CJCI-FM is a Canadian radio station broadcasting at 97.3 FM in Prince George, British Columbia, owned by Vista Radio. The station currently airs a country format using its on-air brand name as Country 97.

The station was launched in 1970 by Central Interior Radio, broadcasting on 620 AM. In 1983, Central Interior also launched CIBC-FM in the city.

The station moved to its current frequency in 2002, and Central Interior Radio was acquired by the Vista Broadcast Group in 2005.

References

External links
 Country 97
 
 

Jci
Jci
Jci
Radio stations established in 1970
1970 establishments in British Columbia